The National Film Award – Special Jury Award / Special Mention (Book on Cinema) is one of the National Film Awards given by Directorate of Film Festivals, India. Instituted in 1995 and awarded at 43rd National Film Awards and lastly awarded in 2014 at 62nd National Film Awards.

The awards aim at encouraging study and appreciation of cinema as an art form and dissemination of information and critical appreciation of this art-form through publication of books, articles, reviews etc. All the award winners are awarded with Certificate of Merit.

Winners 

All the award winners are awarded with Certificate of Merit. Following are the winners over the years:

References

External links 
 National Film Awards Archives
 Official Page for Directorate of Film Festivals, India

Special Jury Award Special Mention (Book on Cinema)